Wolf Creek 2 is a 2013 Australian horror film co-written and directed by Greg McLean. The film is a sequel to the 2005 film Wolf Creek and stars John Jarratt, reprising his role as Mick Taylor. It was released on 30 August 2013 at the Venice Film Festival, then released in Australia on 20 February 2014.

The film follows a young German couple, and a British tourist, who fall victim to the kidnapping and torture of Mick Taylor, a deranged xenophobic killer, while travelling in the Australian outback. Similar to the 2005 film, the plot is based upon the real-life murders of backpackers by Ivan Milat in the 1990s and Bradley Murdoch in 2001. The film received mixed reviews from critics, praising the acting from Jarratt and Corr, but criticism for the violence and gore. The film grossed over $4.7 million at the Australian box office.

A third film, Wolf Creek 3, is currently in development.

Plot
In North Western Australia, highway patrol officers Gary Bulmer and Brian O'Connor are parked by an outback highway, desperate to meet a quota for speeding tickets. Mick Taylor (John Jarratt) drives past going under the speed limit and they pull him over, claiming he was speeding. After belittling and insulting Mick, the two officers give him a speeding ticket and an order to get rid of his truck. Soon after in retaliation, Mick shoots O'Connor in the head as the officers drive away, causing the car to crash in a gully. Despite Bulmer's desperate pleas, Mick breaks his leg, stabs him in the back with a bowie knife and places the mortally wounded officer back in the car before dousing it with petrol and setting it alight. Mick departs, leaving Bulmer to burn alive in the resulting explosion.

Meanwhile, a young German couple, Rutger and Katarina, hitchhike from Sydney to Wolf Creek Crater and camp nearby. In the middle of the night, Mick arrives at the campsite and offers them a lift to a caravan site so they do not get charged for camping in a national park. When Rutger declines his offer, Mick loses his temper and stabs Rutger in the back. He then ties Katarina up and prepares to rape her, but a wounded Rutger battles Mick; Rutger is eventually overpowered and decapitated. Mick then tells Katarina they'll be spending "a fun couple of months together" before choking her until she falls unconscious.

Katarina wakes up later in the night to see Mick cutting up Rutger's body to feed to his dogs. She flees into the bush and Mick pursues her in his truck, referring to this as playing a game of hide and seek. At the same time, English tourist Paul Hammersmith (Ryan Corr) is driving along the highway, and stops when he sees Katarina standing in the road. He picks her up, but Mick relentlessly pursues them. Mick shoots at Paul, but accidentally kills Katarina instead. Paul then drives off, remorsefully leaving Katarina's body in the sand and covering it with just a sleeping bag at daybreak. Mick must now track and kill Paul as a witness to his killing of Katarina. He also blames Paul for taking his 'plaything' (Katarina) away from him, even though he, Mick, fired the shot that killed her.

Paul reaches a highway. Realising he is off course and has low fuel, he tries to flag down a truck in the distance. He soon realises that Mick is driving the truck, having killed the original driver. After a long chase, during which Mick runs over numerous kangaroos which are crossing the highway, Mick nudges Paul's vehicle at a steep hillside, sending it rolling down into a valley. Paul survives the crash and taunts Mick, who sends the truck hurtling down into Paul's vehicle, which explodes as Paul barely escapes the area. Paul treks across the outback for hours looking for help. Exhausted and dehydrated, he passes out near an outback homestead and is given food and shelter by an elderly couple. They plan to take Paul to the nearest town after he has eaten, but Mick finds the house, and shoots the couple dead. Paul flees again; Mick catches Paul hiding in the grassland and knocks him out.

Paul wakes up in Mick's dungeon, zip-tied to a chair. Mick is furious at Paul for his role in Katarina's death and prepares to torture him, but Paul pacifies him with his "English wit" by narrating limericks and leading Mick in drinking songs that he claims he learned at boarding school. He also gets Mick to join him in singing Rolf Harris's Tie Me Kangaroo Down, Sport. Mick's torture for Paul consists of a ten question quiz about Australian culture and history, with a promise to free him if he answers five of them correctly. However, for each question Paul answers incorrectly, he loses a finger. Paul answers the first two questions correctly and reveals that he is a history major. After he gets the next question 'wrong', Mick (irritated by Paul's knowledge) grinds off one of his fingers with a sander.

When Paul intentionally gets the next answer wrong, Mick cuts his other hand free (at Paul's request) from the zip tie and grinds off a finger. Paul then grabs a nearby hammer and clubs Mick with it before fleeing through the tunnels of the dungeon. Paul finds numerous decayed corpses and a severely emaciated woman begging to be freed. While being pursued by an injured Mick, Paul eventually stumbles across an exit, but notices a sheet on the ground directly in front of it. Lifting it up, he finds a Punji stick trap underneath. As he considers trying to jump over it, he hears someone coming and hides, assuming it's Mick. When the figure approaches, he knocks them into the trap and kills them; it was the woman he encountered earlier. Immediately afterwards, Mick finds and subdues Paul, and headbutts him unconscious.

When he wakes up, Paul finds himself, dressed only in his underpants, on a footpath in a small town, with multiple wounds across his body. He finds a handwritten note near him which reads "LOSER" before being discovered by two police officers. A series of title cards before the credits reveal that despite reporting Mick to the police, Paul was held as a suspect in various unsolved murders in the Wolf Creek area. During the investigation, he suffered a complete mental breakdown and was deported back to the UK and placed in full-time care at Ashworth Hospital, Merseyside. The film ends like the first film with Mick walking off into the outback with his rifle.

Cast
 John Jarratt as Mick Taylor, a sadistic and xenophobic serial killer.
 Ryan Corr as Paul Hammersmith, a tourist visiting from England who unexpectedly interferes with Mick's plans and becomes his new victim.
 Shannon Ashlyn as Katarina Schmidt, a German tourist and Rutger's girlfriend.
 Philippe Klaus as Rutger Enqvist, a tourist visiting from Germany and Katarina's boyfriend.
 Shane Connor as Senior Sergeant Gary Bulmer Jr
 Ben Gerrard as Constable Brian O'Connor
 Gerard Kennedy as Jack, an elderly man who lives in a remote outback cottage.
 Annie Byron as Lil, Jack's wife.
 Jordan Cowan as Young Woman, one of Mick's victims who has become emaciated and completely deranged after years of captivity.

Production
Despite the first film's success, McLean chose to begin work on the film Rogue rather than develop a sequel. Later he said he regretted that decision: 'If I'd known then what I know now about how long it would take to get this up, I'd probably have said yes to a sequel earlier.'

In 2010, McLean announced that he was developing a sequel and confirmed that Jarratt would be returning to portray Mick Taylor.

Geoffrey Edelsten signed on to invest in the production of Wolf Creek 2, but later withdrew his support of the film and alleged that McLean had misled him into believing that he would not be the largest single private investor. When the funding deadline had passed, Emu Creek Pictures sent Edelsten's Millennium Management a statutory demand for A$4.923 million. Edelsten asked the Supreme Court of Victoria to set aside the demand so he could seek further legal recourse. McLean and Emu Creek Pictures denied they had misled Edelsten, and said they had shown Edelsten documents that clearly set out his A$5 million share of the A$5.2  million support expected from private investors. The funding plan specified that any shortfall from that level would be made up by Screen Australia and the South Australian Film Corporation (SAFC).

Filming was set to begin in 2011, but the loss of Edelsten's backing delayed the production. McLean risked losing the funds from the government bodies if he could not find another private investor. Early in 2012 the SAFC withdrew its commitment but recommitted in September to the tune of A$400,000, enabling production to resume. Filming began in 2012 and continued into early 2013.

While developing the script, McLean chose to focus on Mick Taylor as the character was "the most interesting thing about the first movie." McLean says that the second story, like the first, is based on true events, a point he said would be "pretty obvious when [viewers] see the film".

Release
Wolf Creek 2 was released theatrically in Australia on 20 February 2014. The film also opened in the United States on 17 April 2014.

Home media
The film was released on DVD, digital and Blu-ray Disc in Australia on 25 June 2014 through Roadshow Entertainment. Two cuts of the film were released, a theatrical and director's cut. Special features include an Audio commentary by writer/director/producer Greg McLean, a fifty-minute documentary titled Creating a Monster: The Making of Wolf Creek 2 and nine deleted scenes.

Reception

Box office
The film grossed over $1,510,578 at the box office, making it the number one film in its opening weekend. The movie's total collection in Australia stood at $4,732,168.

Critical response
Initial response at the Venice Film Festival was mostly positive. The Hollywood Reporter summarized the story thus: 'A psychopathic serial killer and his knife carve out an edge-of-seat gorefest that follows safely in the tracks of its predecessor.' Varietys review commented that the film was "neither as striking nor as fundamentally scary as its predecessor" but was "still quite a ride, and one that genre-inclined distribs should have no qualms about hitching." Likewise, Norman Gator of The Sydney Morning Herald gave the film four out of four stars, calling it "Perhaps the greatest Aussie flick ever made. I hope to hell there'll be a third one."

The film has a rating of 50% on Rotten Tomatoes based on reviews from 52 critics, with an average rating of 5.6/10. The site's critical consensus states "After a strong start, Wolf Creek 2 devolves into an unnecessary – and disappointingly predictable – sequel." The film has a score of 44 out of 100 on Metacritic based on 13 critics indicating "Mixed or average reviews."

Accolades

TV series and Sequel

In 2016, the Wolf Creek web television series debuted on Stan. The series saw Jarratt return to his role as Mick Taylor. A second series aired in 2017.

As of April 2022, after a series of delays, some linked to the Covid pandemic, another film, Wolf Creek 3, was in the development phase, specifically, location scouting. It will be directed by Rachele Wiggins and written by Duncan Samarasinghe with Greg McLean as Producer. Altitude Film Distribution will distribute in the U.K. John Jarratt will reprise his role as the psychopathic Mick Taylor. "An American family takes a dream trip to the Australian outback and soon draws the attention of notorious serial killer Mick Taylor. A hellish nightmare ensues as the couple’s two children escape only to be hunted by Australia’s most infamous killer." Wolf Creek 3 is planned for release later in 2023, with the tagline There Will be Blood.

References

External links
 

2013 films
2013 horror films
2013 horror thriller films
2013 independent films
2010s road movies
2010s serial killer films
2010s slasher films
Australian independent films
Australian sequel films
Australian horror films
Australian slasher films
Australian thriller films
2010s German-language films
Films set in Western Australia
Films shot in Adelaide
Horror films based on actual events
Crime films based on actual events
Films directed by Greg McLean
Films scored by Johnny Klimek
Australian action adventure films
Films set in deserts
Films set in the Outback
Screen Australia films
Roadshow Entertainment films
2010s English-language films